Savar Cantonment Public School and College is situated at Savar Cantonment in Savar, Dhaka, Bangladesh. The institution is under the supervision of the director of Bangladesh Army Education Corps

See also
 Cantonment Public School and College, Rangpur
 Ispahani Public School & College
 Adamjee Cantonment College

References

Schools in Dhaka District
Educational institutions established in 1977
1977 establishments in Bangladesh
Educational Institutions affiliated with Bangladesh Army